The 1973 Tour de France was the 60th edition of the Tour de France, one of cycling's Grand Tours. Eddy Merckx, winner of the previous four editions, did not start the 1973 Tour, partly to avoid angry French fans and partly to please his sponsor; instead he rode and won the 1973 Vuelta a España and the 1973 Giro d'Italia. In his absence, Luis Ocaña dominated the race by winning four mountain stages and two time trials. The result being a margin of victory exceeding 15 minutes.

In 1973, a new team classification was added: the team points classification, calculated by adding the three best stage rankings per team; it would be calculated until 1988.

Teams

The Italian teams did not join the 1973 Tour de France, because no top French cyclist rode the 1973 Giro d'Italia. The Tour started with 12 teams, each with 11 cyclists.

The teams entering the race were:

 
 
 
 
 
 
 
 
 
 De Kova–Lejeune
 
 La Casera–Peña Bahamontes

Pre-race favourites

The winner of the previous four editions, Eddy Merckx had changed sponsors to the Italian Molteni. His contract said that he had to start in the 1973 Vuelta a España and the 1973 Giro d'Italia, and Merckx thought it was impossible to start in three grand tours in one year, so he stayed away from the Tour. Ocaña, who was in great shape, was now the main favourite, with Fuente, Poulidor and Thévenet as his biggest threats. Ocaña was not the clear favourite; he had already crashed out of the Tour three times, and he was seen as fragile. Zoetemelk had changed teams, because he did not have the full support of his team leader. Among the Italian riders absent were world champion Marino Basso and former Tour winner Felice Gimondi.

Route and stages
After the 1972 Tour de France, there were rumours that the 1973 Tour would become easier, to suit French cyclist Cyrille Guimard better. However, when the 1973 Tour route was announced in December 1972, the organisation had included three more mountains compared to 1972.

Race overview

Zoetemelk won the opening prologue, one second ahead of Poulidor. In the first part of the next stage, Teirlinck won and took over the lead. Ocaña and Herman Van Springel fell down when a dog crossed the road, but both suffered no serious damage. In the second part of that stage, Van Springel bridged the gap to Catieau, who had escaped. Van Springel did all the work to stay away, while Catieau did not help his team captain's rival. They stayed away until the end of the stage, where Catieau won the sprint, and Van Springel became the new race leader.

In the third stage, a group with Guimard and Ocana escaped. Van Springel, Zoetemelk, Fuentes, Thévenet and Poulidor were not in that group, and had to chase them. The group stayed away, Guimard won the sprint and Catieau became the race leader. More important for the final result was that Ocaña won more than two minutes on Zoetemelk, and more than seven minutes on Fuente.

In stage seven, when the first mountains were climbed, Ocaña attacked, and only Zoetemelk could follow. A few kilometers from the summit, Zoetemelk had to let Ocaña go, and Ocaña finished solo. Ocaña became the new race leader, almost three minutes ahead of Zoetemelk. In the eighth stage, Ocaña and Fuente both attacked. Ocaña and Fuente did not like each other, and when Fuente stopped working, Ocaña was angry, especially when Fuente passed him just before the top of the Izoard to steal the points for the mountain classification. When Fuente had a flat tire, Ocaña did not wait for him, and left him behind, beating him by one minute at the finish line. All the others were far behind: Thévenet and Martinez followed after seven minutes, the other pre-race favourites after twenty minutes.

In the thirteenth stage, Poulidor crashed, and was taken away with a helicopter. In the sixteenth stage, the cyclists were slower than expected, and finished one hour after the latest time schedule. The train that they should have taken had already left, and they had to use buses.

In the time trial in stage 17, Fuente lost his second place in the general classification to Thévenet. Fuente tried to take it back in the mountain stage 18, but he failed and even lost some time.

Doping
Three cyclists tested positive during the 1973 Tour de France: Barry Hoban, after the 9th stage; Claude Baud, after the 13th stage; and Michel Roques, after the 18th stage. All three received a fine of 1000 Swiss Francs, one-month suspension and ten minutes penalty time in the general classification.

Classification leadership and minor prizes

There were several classifications in the 1973 Tour de France, three of them awarding jerseys to their leaders. The most important was the general classification, calculated by adding each cyclist's finishing times on each stage. The cyclist with the least accumulated time was the race leader, identified by the yellow jersey; the winner of this classification is considered the winner of the Tour.

Additionally, there was a points classification, where cyclists got points for finishing among the best in a stage finish, or in intermediate sprints. The cyclist with the most points lead the classification, and was identified with a green jersey.

There was also a mountains classification. The organisation had categorised some climbs as either first, second, third, or fourth-category; points for this classification were won by the first cyclists that reached the top of these climbs first, with more points available for the higher-categorised climbs. The cyclist with the most points lead the classification, but was not identified with a jersey in 1973.

Another classification was the combination classification. This classification was calculated as a combination of the other classifications, its leader wore the white jersey.

The fifth individual classification was the intermediate sprints classification. This classification had similar rules as the points classification, but only points were awarded on intermediate sprints. In 1973, this classification had no associated jersey.

For the team classification, the times of the best three cyclists per team on each stage were added; the leading team was the team with the lowest total time. The riders in the team that led this classification were identified by yellow caps. For the first time, there was also a team points classification. Cyclists received points according to their finishing position on each stage, with the first rider receiving one point. The first three finishers of each team had their points combined, and the team with the fewest points led the classification. The riders of the team leading this classification wore green caps.

In addition, there was a combativity award, in which a jury composed of journalists gave points after certain stages to the cyclist they considered most combative. The split stages each had a combined winner. At the conclusion of the Tour, Luis Ocaña won the overall super-combativity award, also decided by journalists. The Souvenir Henri Desgrange was given to the first rider to pass the memorial to Tour founder Henri Desgrange near the summit of the Col du Galibier on stage 8. This prize was won by Ocaña.

Final standings

General classification

Points classification

Mountains classification

Combination classification

Intermediate sprints classification

Team classification

Team points classification

Notes

References

Bibliography

External links

 
Tour
Tour
Tour de France by year
Tour de France, 1973
Tour de France
Tour de France
1973 Super Prestige Pernod